Hof HaSharon Regional Council (Mo'atza Azorit Hof HaSharon, lit. Sharon Coast Regional Council), is a regional council in the Central and Tel Aviv districts of Israel. It is located on the coastline in the Sharon area between Netanya and Herzliya.

The offices of the local authority are located in kibbutz Shefayim, as is the joint middle school and high school.

Before the 20th century, the territory of Hof HaSharon Regional Council formed the south-western part of the Forest of Sharon, a hallmark of the region's historical landscape. It was an open woodland dominated by Mount Tabor Oak (Quercus ithaburensi), which extended from Kfar Yona in the north to Ra'anana in the south. The local Arab inhabitants traditionally used the area for pasture, firewood and intermittent cultivation. The intensification of settlement and agriculture in the coastal plain during the 19th century led to deforestation and subsequent environmental degradation known from Hebrew sources.

It was established in 1949 and govern 14 communities and an educational institute (Neve Hadassah).

Settlements

Kibbutzim
Ga'ash
Glil Yam (Tel Aviv District)
Shefayim
Tel Yitzhak
Yakum

Moshavim
Batzra
Beit Yehoshua
Bnei Zion
Kfar Netter
Rishpon
Udim

Other villages
Arsuf (near the ruins of Apollonia)
Harutzim (community settlement)
Kiryat Shlomo (hospital)
Neve Hadassah (youth village)

References

External links

 
Hof Hasharon - inter-urban coastal strip Israel Union for Environmental Defense

 
Regional councils in Israel
1949 establishments in Israel
Sharon plain